Strategy forms a major part of American football. Both teams plan many aspects of their plays (offense) and response to plays (defense), such as what formations they take, who they put on the field, and the roles and instructions each player are given. Throughout a game, each team adapts to the other's apparent strengths and weaknesses, trying various approaches to outmaneuver or overpower their opponent in order to win the game.

Offensive strategy
The goal of the offense is, most generally, to score points. In order to accomplish this goal, coaches and players plan and execute plays – based on a variety of factors: The players involved, the opponent's defensive strategy, the amount of time remaining before halftime or the end of the game, and the number of points needed to win the game. Strategically, the offense can prolong their possession of the ball to prevent the opponent from scoring. Offensive scoring chances, or drives, end when they cannot move the ball 10 yards or the ball is turned over via fumble or interception.

Offensive players

On offense, there are three types of players: linemen, backs, and receivers. These players' positions and duties on the field vary from one offensive scheme to another.

The position names (as well as the abbreviations recognized by coaches, players, and fans) vary from one team's playbook to another, but what follow are among the most commonly used:

Linemen

(This is understood to be players on the line other than at the ends; also referred to as "interior linemen". The ends—i.e., the players at the ends of the line—are discussed below under "Receivers".)
 Center: The Center ("C") is the player who snaps the ball to the quarterback. Like the other four linemen, his job consists of both run blocking (pushing the defenders away from the ball carrier on a running play) and pass blocking (stopping the defenders from disrupting or tackling the quarterback). The center is also usually responsible for calling the blocking schemes on the line, telling the other linemen which defenders to block.
 Guard: Guards ("G") line up on both sides of the center. The guards are generally bigger than the center and are typically better run blockers than pass blockers.
 Tackle: Tackles ("T") are the "bookends" of the offensive line. They are usually the biggest offensive linemen (at the NFL level they are typically at least , and can be as tall as ), but also must have great hand and foot coordination to successfully protect against pass rushes. If a team has a right-handed quarterback, the left tackle is usually the best pass blocker on the line since they are responsible for preventing a "blindside" pass rush the quarterback might not see. Right tackles have the same responsibilities with left-handed quarterbacks.

Backs
Backs are so named because they line up behind (in back of) the line of scrimmage at the start of the play.
 Quarterback: The Quarterback ("QB") lines up directly behind the center, where they take the ball (in an action called the 'snap') and puts it into play. The quarterback's primary duty is either passing (throwing) the ball or handing the ball to a running back ("RB") who carries the ball downfield. In some cases the quarterback is called upon to run the ball downfield themself, either because the play is designed that way or the quarterback has no other options available. A quarterback can even act as a receiver, catching a pass thrown by another player during a "trick play". In most cases, the quarterback also communicates to the other players the play they are going to run correctly, both in the huddle before the team lines up to execute the play and immediately before the ball snap. Quarterbacks must be quick to 1.read defenses accurately and 2.precisely throw the ball. As the leader of the offense, the Quarterback is considered by many to be the most important player on the offensive field.
 Fullback: The Fullback ("FB") lines up behind the quarterback and is involved in running, blocking, and (in some cases) catching passes. In many offensive schemes the fullback is considered to be a running back, but this player is usually bigger and more physical than other running backs on the team and is more involved in blocking than in running or receiving.
 Halfback: The Halfback ("HB"), also referred to as a "tailback" ("TB") or more generically as a running back, lines up behind the quarterback and in many cases behind the fullback, or rarely behind center to receive the snap (see Wildcat formation). A halfback's responsibilities include running the ball, catching passes, blocking, and sometimes even throwing the ball on trick plays.

Receivers

(Eligible receivers are the ends and the backs, other than an NFL quarterback lined up "under center". Not all backs fall into the wide receiver category below.)
 Wide receiver: Depending on the formation, an offense may have anywhere from zero to five wide receivers (WR). Most basic formations feature either two or three WRs, who either line up on the line of scrimmage (a WR in this position is sometimes referred to as split end) or behind the line of scrimmage (where they are referred to as flankers, wingbacks or slotbacks). WRs are among the fastest and most agile players on the team and their main job is to catch passes and run after the catch. Well-rounded receivers are also effective blockers and, in some cases, can act as running backs on trick plays.
 Tight end: The tight end (TE) was traditionally a blocking position but is now considered a combination wide receiver/lineman. TEs normally line up on the line of scrimmage next to the tackles. They are among the most well-rounded athletes on the field as they must be strong enough to run block and pass block as well as agile enough to run pass routes and catch the football.

Offensive formations

Before the ball is snapped the offensive team lines up in a formation. The type of formation used is determined by the game situation. Teams often have "special formations" that they only use in obvious passing situations, short yardage, goal line situations, or formations they have developed for that particular game just to confuse the defense.
There are a nearly unlimited number of possible formations – a few of the more common ones are:
 Option offense
 Pro set
 Shotgun formation
 Wishbone formation
 I formation
 Single-wing formation
 T formation
 Goal line formation
 Single set back
 Wildcat formation
 Pistol formation
 Victory formation

Offensive plays
When the team is in formation and the quarterback gives a signal, either by calling out instructions or giving a non-verbal cue (a so-called "silent count"), the center snaps the ball to the quarterback and a play begins.

Running plays
A running play occurs when the quarterback hands the ball to another player, who then attempts to carry the ball past the line of scrimmage and gain yards, or the quarterback keeps the ball themself and runs beyond the line of scrimmage. In both cases, the offensive line's main job is to run block, preventing the defensive players from tackling the ball carrier.

The choice of running play depends on the strengths of an offensive team, the weaknesses of the defense they are opposing, and the distance needed to score a touchdown or gain a first down. There are many kinds of running plays, including:
 Plunge/Dive
 Sweep
 Reverse
 Off Tackle
 Student Body Right
 Draw
 Counter Trey
 Quarterback sneak
 QB sweep
 Bootleg
 Option
 Counter
 Power
 Zone
 Trap run

Passing plays
When a passing play occurs, the backs and receivers run specific patterns, or routes, and the quarterback throws the ball to one of the players. On these plays, the offensive line's main job is to prevent defensive players from tackling the quarterback before he throws the ball (a "sack") or disrupting the quarterback in any other way during the play.

When successful, passing plays tend to cover more ground than running plays, so they are often used when the offensive team needs to gain a large number of yards. Even if they do not need to gain a large number of yards, it would be foolish to keep doing run plays because the defense could predict it. However, run plays are used to tire the defensive linemen in between passing plays in order to protect the QB from sacks. Run plays can also be used to set up pass plays called play action. This is where the quarterback and running back will fake a run play while receivers run a route. The goal is for the defense to think it is a run play so the receivers will be open and be an easier completion for the quarterback. This will also keep the defense off balance if a team is successfully able to run the ball, the defense will be preparing for the run but when the offense runs a play action, it will be a big play if the pass is completed.

Different kinds of pass plays include:                                                                                                                                                  
 Fly route
 Slant route
 Out route
 Screen pass
 Button hook
 Corner Route
 Hail Mary
 Seam route

Eligible receivers
One general rule teams must take into account when creating their passing strategy is that only certain players are allowed to catch forward passes. If a player who is not an eligible receiver receives a thrown pass, the team could be penalized. However, if prior to a play the team reports to the referee that a normally ineligible receiver will act as an eligible receiver for one play, that player is allowed to catch passes. Teams will use this strategy from time to time to confuse the defense or force them to devote more attention to possible pass catchers.

Specific offensive strategies
Using a combination of passing plays and running plays, the offense tries to gain the yards needed for a first down, touchdown, or field goal. Over the years several football coaches and offensive coordinators have developed some well-known and widely used offensive strategies:
 Option offense
 Run and shoot offense
 Smashmouth offense
 Air Coryell
 Spread offense
 West Coast offense
 Pistol offense
 Pro-style offense
 Marty ball
 Air Raid offense

Play calling systems

Distinct from the offensive strategies or philosophies, which govern how a team moves the ball down the field, whether a team relies on downfield passes, short passes, inside runs, etc. are the ways in which plays are called. These play calling systems often developed alongside certain offensive strategies, though the systems themselves can work with any strategy. The differences between the systems focus on the specific language used to communicate plays to players. In the NFL, three basic systems predominate:
 The West Coast system, which developed alongside the West Coast offense, uses specific words to describe formations, blocking schemes, and the routes that runners or pass receivers run. A typical play name would read "FB West Right Slot 372 Y Stick": FB West Right Slot describes the formation, 372 describes the blocking scheme, while Y Stick describes the route run by the primary receiver (Y receiver or tight end).
 The Coryell system, which developed alongside the Air Coryell offense, is based on a numerical code known as a "route tree". Play calling uses a three digit number, for example 896, where each digit tells a specific receiver which route to run: The leftmost receiver runs an "8" or post route, the middle receiver runs a "9" or go route, and the rightmost receiver runs a "6" or in route.
 The Erhardt–Perkins system, developed in the 1970s by two assistant coaches with the New England Patriots, is based on single word concepts rather than assigning each player a role in the play. One word, say "ghost", tells each receiver what to do; the concept is divorced from the formation, so regardless of the formation, each player, based on where he is lined up, runs the proper pattern determined by the "ghost" concept. This places a heavy emphasis on memorization (as every player needs to know every route in every concept, not just specific routes to run on specific plays), but also allows for more efficient communication (one word does the job of complex sentences of coded words and numbers) and allows for a greater flexibility by allowing every play to be run from every possible formation.

Defensive strategy
The goal of defensive strategy is to prevent the opposing offense from gaining yards and scoring points, either by preventing the offense from advancing the ball beyond the line of scrimmage or by the defense taking the ball away from the offense (referred to as a turnover) and scoring points themselves.

Defensive players

On defense, there are three types of players: linemen, linebackers, and defensive backs (also called secondary players). These players' specific positions on the field and duties during the game vary depending on the type of defense being used as well as the kind of offense the defense is facing.

Defensive line
The defensive line lines up in front of the offensive line. The defensive lineman's responsibility is to prevent the offensive line from opening up running lanes for the running back or to sack the quarterback, depending on whether the play is a passing or running play. Most of the time, defensive linemen attack the offensive line but in some plays they drop back in pass coverage to confuse the opposite team.
 Defensive nose guard: The nose guard ("NG"), also known as a nose tackle ("NT"), lines up across from the center. Nose guards are among the biggest players on the field and mainly are used to push back the center or the guard to stop a running play or to move the offensive linemen to where the linebackers can rush the quarterback.
 Defensive tackle: The defensive tackle ("DT") lines up against the guard or center on the offensive line. Defensive tackles are generally the biggest and most powerful players on defense; many of them are of the same size as the offensive line. They tend to be more the "run-stopping" type rather than being good at rushing the quarterback themselves.
 Defensive end: Defensive ends ("DE") line up just outside the offensive tackle. Defensive ends need to be strong to be able to not be pushed back by the offensive line, yet fast enough to run around the offensive tackle. There are different types of defensive ends; some are about as strong as DTs and are considered more adept at stopping the run, while others are fast and agile, and are much better at rushing the quarterback than stopping the run.

Linebackers
Linebackers stand behind the defensive linemen or set themselves up on the line of scrimmage. Depending on the type of defensive strategy being used, a linebacker's responsibilities can include helping to stop the run, rushing the quarterback, or dropping back in pass protection.
 Outside linebackers: The outside linebackers ("OLB") set up on the outside portion of the line of scrimmage. They are often used to rush the quarterback. OLBs tend to be the fastest and most agile linebackers on the defense.
 Inside linebackers: Inside linebackers ("ILB"), sometimes also referred to as middle linebackers ("MLB") set up on the inside portion of the line of scrimmage. ILBs tend to be the biggest and strongest linebackers on the defense.

Defensive backs
Defensive backs stand behind the linebackers. Their primary responsibility is pass coverage, although they can also be involved in stopping the run or rushing the quarterback.
 Cornerback: The cornerback ("CB") lines up opposite the opposing offense's wide receiver(s). Their main job is to cover wide receivers and prevent them from catching passes, or tackle them if they do.
 Safety: A defense's safeties ("S") are usually the farthest away from the line of scrimmage when the play starts. Their job is to help the cornerbacks cover receivers and, if necessary, help the defensive line and linebackers protect against the run. Because of this "do everything" role, most safeties are the best all-around athletes on the defense. Safeties are designated as strong safeties ("SS") or free safeties ("FS"). The strong safety typically plays closer to the line, matches up against tight ends, and is more involved in the run, while the free safety typically is farther from the line and plays more of a "last line of defense" role in both the pass and run game.

Defensive formations

The most common way to describe a basic defensive formation is by stating the number of linemen involved followed by the number of linebackers. The number of defensive backs is usually not mentioned, though if it is, (such as in the "3–3–5"), the number typically appears after the number of linebackers, thus the formula would go (# of linemen)–(# of linebackers)–(# of defensive backs [if stated]) in these situations. This naming rule does not always apply when the personnel for a certain formation are lined up in a way that changes the function of the players in the defense. A good example to help explain this would be the "3–5–3," which actually uses the 3–3–5 personnel, but has the five defensive backs arranged with "3 deep", thus grouping the other two defensive backs with the linebacker group.

By far the most common alignments are four down linemen and three linebackers (a "4–3" defense), or three down linemen and four linebackers ("3–4"), but other formations such as five linemen and two linebackers ("5–2"), or three linemen, three linebackers, and five defensive backs ("3–3–5") are also used by a number of teams.

On plays where the defense expects the offense to pass, naming emphasis is often placed on the number of defensive backs. In a basic 4–3 or 3–4 defense, there are four defensive backs on the field (2 cornerbacks [CB], 1 strong safety [SS], and 1 free safety [FS]). When one of the linemen or linebackers is removed and an additional defensive back is added, common alignments of these five defensive back packages are the "nickel" package, which includes 3 CB, 1 SS, and 1 FS, and the "3–3–5," which is a nickel package variant that includes either 2 CB, 2 SS, and 1 FS, or 3 CB, 1 SS, and 1 FS like the standard nickel package. When a sixth defensive back is inserted, it is known as a "dime" package (4CB, 1SS, 1FS). In rare instances when a seventh defensive back is inserted, it is known as a "quarter" package (5CB, 1SS, 1FS or 4CB, 2SS, 1FS).

As with offensive formations, there are many combinations that can be used to set up a defense. Unusual defensive alignments are constantly used in an effort to neutralize a given offense's strengths. In winning Super Bowl XXV, the New York Giants played with two down linemen, four linebackers and five defensive backs, a strategy that prevented their opponents, the Buffalo Bills, a team with a strong passing game, from completing long passes. In a 2004 game, the New England Patriots used no down linemen and seven linebackers for two plays against the Miami Dolphins.

Some of the more familiar defensive formations include:
 4–3
 3–4
 5–2
 4–4
 3–3–5
 46 defense
 Nickel
 Dime
 Quarter or Prevent
 Eight-in-the-box defense

Defensive plays
The defense must wait until the ball is snapped by the opposing center before they can move across the line of scrimmage or otherwise engage any of the offensive players. Once an opposing offense has broken their huddle and lined up in their formation, defensive players often call out instructions to each other to make last-second adjustments to the defense.

Run defense
To prevent the opposing offense from gaining yards on the ground, a defense might put more emphasis on their run defense. This generally involves placing more players close to the line of scrimmage to get to the ball carrier more quickly. This strategy is often used when the opposing offense only needs to gain a few yards to make a first down or score a touchdown.

Pass defense
When the defense believes the opposing offense will pass the ball, they go into pass defense. There are two general schemes for defending against the pass:
 Man-to-man, where each eligible receiver is covered by a defensive back or a linebacker.
 Zone, where certain players (usually defensive backs or linebackers, though occasionally linemen as well) are assigned an area on the field that they are to cover.

Blitz
There are times when a defense believes that the best way to stop the offense is to rush the quarterback, which involves sending several players charging at the line of scrimmage in an attempt to tackle the quarterback before he can throw the ball or hand it to another player. Any player on the defense is allowed to rush the quarterback, and many schemes have been developed over 50 years that involve complicated or unusual blitz "packages".

Specific defensive strategies
Defensive strategies differ somewhat from offensive strategies in that, unlike offenses that have very specific, detailed plans and assignments for each player, defenses are more reactive, with each player's general goal being to "stop the offense" by tackling the ball carrier, breaking up passing plays, taking the ball away from the offense, or sacking the quarterback. Whereas precision and timing are among the most important parts of offensive strategy, defensive strategies often emphasize aggressiveness and the ability to react to plays as they develop.

Nevertheless, there are many defensive strategies that have been developed over the years that coaches use as a framework for their general defense, making specific adjustments depending on the capabilities of their players and the opponent they are facing.

Some of the most commonly known and used defensive strategies include:
 Man-to-man
 Coverage shells (cover 2, cover 3, etc.)
 Zone blitz
 Tampa 2
 46 defense
 5–5–1 Two-level defense

Special teams strategy
A special team is the group of players who take the field during kickoffs, free kicks, punts, and field goal attempts. Most football teams' special teams include one or more kickers, a long snapper (who specializes in accurate snaps over long distances), kick returners who catch and carry the ball after it is kicked by the opposing team, and blockers who defend during kicks and returns.

Most special teams are made up of players who act as backups or substitutes on the team's offensive and defensive units. Because of the risk of injury, it is uncommon for a starting offensive or defensive player to also play on a special teams unit.

A variety of strategic plays can be attempted during kickoffs, punts, and field goals—to surprise the opposition and score points, gain yardage or first downs, or recover possession of the kicked ball.

Kickoffs
A kickoff occurs at the beginning of each half, overtime period (not in college), and following each touchdown, successful field goal, or safety. Strategically, the coach of the other team may choose to have his players kick the ball in one of several ways:
 Standard kickoff: The kicker attempts a high kick meant to travel the greatest possible distance upfield. The kicking team's primary goal is to stop the opposing team's returner as close as possible to the end zone, thus forcing that team to advance the ball a longer distance to score.
 Onside kick: This is a very short kick with the goal of the kicking team recovering possession after kicking the ball ten or more yards, usually attempted in the closing minutes of play when a team needs to score again quickly to have a chance of winning.
 "Squib kick" or "pooch kick": The squib kick is a low kick that may hit the ground and bounce in a random fashion, making it less predictable. A squib kick is generally used when trying to avoid a run-back, although this outcome is not guaranteed. A pooch kick is used for a similar purpose, except is a short, high kick that the kickoff team can get to before there is a return. Because the kick does not travel nearly as far as a standard kickoff, this strategy gives the opposing team better average field position, but the advantage is that a long kick return is less likely.
 Kickoff out of bounds: If a kickoff travels over the sidelines either in the air, or bounces in the field of play, then rolls out of bounds without being touched by a player on the receiving team, the play results in an illegal procedure penalty. The ball is then spotted 30 yards from the spot of the kick or at the out-of-bounds, resulting in a first down (and beginning of offensive series) for the receiving team. Sometimes, although very rarely, the kicking team purposely kicks the ball out of bounds if they're facing an excellent kick returner.

Punts
 Standard punts: punts on fourth down when the chances of gaining enough yards for a first down are slim and when the ball is too far from the goalpost to allow a field goal try. Generally, a member of the opposing team moves into position to catch the ball. He may try to gain yards by running the ball downfield, or he may signal a fair catch by waving one arm above his head, thus signaling that he won't try to return the ball downfield. A player who has signaled a fair catch may not be tackled after catching the ball, or the player who tackled them is penalized for kick-catching interference.
 Pooch punts: Occasionally, a coach lines his team up in a shotgun formation and has the quarterback "quick kick", or "pooch punt", to use the element of surprise to cause the defense not to have a receiver ready. Some teams even do this from a field goal formation, having the ball snapped directly to the placekicker who punts the ball downfield instead of trying a field goal that has a low chance for success.
 Fake punts: In much the same way as a fake field goal (described below), a fake punt is an effort to trick the opposition and either score or gain enough yards for a first down. Fake punts are risky for the same reasons as fake field goals and are thus rarely attempted.
 Punts out of bounds: Skilled punters may try to punt a ball past the return team so that the ball touches the playing field in bounds, then rolls out of bounds close to the opposing team's end zone. The drawback to such a punt is that the ball may roll into the end zone (touchback), giving the receiving team normal starting position. Or, if the kick is angled too sharply, it goes out of bounds too early and results in an unusually short, or botched, punt. The best punters are highly regarded for their ability to put the ball out of bounds within five yards of the goal line. These punts are also known as a "coffin corner punt" due to their ability to pin an opposing offense inside its own five-yard line, thus increasing the chances for the opposing defense to score a safety or a defensive touchdown.
 Onside punts: In a few leagues, onside punting is legal. As of 2017, the Canadian Football League is the only professional league to allow it. The XFL allowed onside punting if the ball went 25 yards or more. It can be used as a surprise tactic or a method of covering distances that a regular play could not.
 Field goal attempts: In high school football, a field goal attempt is considered a regular punt if the attempt is no good. Thus, kicking from a field goal formation can possibly offer the chance of a punt without the opposing team having a return man.

The "no punting" strategy is one that forsakes the practice of punting and instead attempts to make fourth down conversions on as many plays as possible. It has been implemented at Pulaski Academy, a top-ranked prep school, and has been advocated by Gregg Easterbrook in his Tuesday Morning Quarterback column and by author Jon Wertheim. Fourth down decisions to punt have been analyzed mathematically by David Romer.

Field goals
Field goals are worth one point after a scored touchdown, or three points in the event that a team does not score a touchdown but feels it is positioned close enough for the kicker to make the attempt.
 Standard field goals: The strategy for a field goal is fairly straightforward. The team on offense forms a protective semicircle behind the line of scrimmage on either side of the center, who snaps the ball to the holder. The holder positions the ball so that the kicker – moving from a short distance away – can quickly get into position and accurately kick the ball through the goalposts. The remaining players block the opposing team, whose members try to break through the protective circle to block the kick or bat it aside for a chance to intercept the ball. If a team misses the field goal, the opposing team takes possession of the ball from the spot where the ball was kicked, as opposed to the line of scrimmage. Several factors, including distance, weather, crowd noise, and a kicker's leg strength and experience determine the success or failure of a field goal attempt.
 Fake field goals: In some situations, a coach may choose to have his team fake a field goal attempt. The players line up as normal, but instead of holding the ball for a kick, the player receiving the snap may run with the ball, hand it off to another player, or attempt to throw it downfield.
 Field goal returns: It is possible for the defensive team to return a missed field goal. If a field goal attempt is short of the goal posts a player may return the ball just as on a punt. Teams usually try a return only when a very long field goal is attempted at the end of the first half or in the closing seconds of a tied game, since in all other cases it is more advantageous for the defense to just let the ball fall short.

Kick and punt returns
 Standard returns: The biggest choice facing a kick returner is whether to attempt to run the ball back. Generally, a returner who catches a kickoff or punt in the "red zone" between the receiving team's own end zone and 20-yard line attempts some sort of return, if only to gain a few yards. If the receiving team's players can get into position quickly, they may be able to allow the returner to gain further yardage, or break away from the pack entirely and score a touchdown.
 Laterals: In extreme cases—generally during kickoff returns in the closing seconds of play—the returner may attempt a lateral pass to avoid the ball being downed in a tackle. The return team may throw as many lateral passes as they choose, and this is normally done in a desperate attempt to keep the ball alive. This notably occurred on January 8, 2000, during a wildcard game between the Tennessee Titans and Buffalo Bills, in a play known as the Music City Miracle. In the game's final seconds, Lorenzo Neal, Frank Wycheck and Kevin Dyson combined on a 75-yard kickoff return touchdown to give the Titans a 22–16 lead (after the extra point), allowing Tennessee to advance to the second round of the playoffs. Another well-known occurrence is an occasion during an NCAA game regarded as "The Play" in which the University of California return team completed five lateral passes for a successful return and a come-from-behind victory over Stanford.
 Fair catches: A kick returner may signal a fair catch if the ball will be caught with good field position, or if the kicking team's members are advancing so quickly that a return is impossible. However, he is penalized if he attempts a return after signaling a fair catch; likewise, players who tackle a returner who has signaled a fair catch are penalized. If a player waves for a fair catch and then fails to touch the ball, it may be downed as normal by the kicking team, but if recovered by the receiving team, may not be advanced. However, if any member of the receiving team catches a ball and then drops it, it becomes a live ball and may be recovered by either side.
 "Live balls" and "Dead balls": If a punted ball is touched after passing the line of scrimmage, even inadvertently, by a member of the receiving team it becomes a live ball and may be recovered as if a fumble by the kicking team. Conversely if the receiving team doesn't touch the ball and a member of the kicking team touches it, the ball is ruled down where it is touched and play is dead. All place-kicked balls—kick-offs, field goal attempts, and the like—are live balls, which may be played in one way or another by either team (subject to restrictions in the case of any "free" kick: see onside kick).

Downing the ball
If, the receiving team does not catch the ball, the kicking team may move into position and try to down it as close as possible to the opposing team's end zone. This is achieved by either catching the ball (generally when close to the end zone so as to prevent a touchback), or surrounding the ball and allowing it to roll or bounce, without touching it, as close as possible to the end zone. If the ball appears to be rolling or bouncing into the end zone, a player may run in front of the goal line and attempt to bat it down or catch it. If a member of the kicking team catches the ball before a member of the receiving team does so, the play is blown dead by the official, and the receiving team takes possession at the spot the ball was spotted by the official.

Thus it is strategically important for kicking teams to get as close to the ball as possible after a punt, so that they may quickly tackle a returner, down the ball as close to the opposing team's end zone as possible, and (if possible) recover the ball after a fumble and regain possession of the ball.

See also
 
 Advanced Football Analytics
 American football
 Bump and run coverage
 American football glossary
 Formation (American football)
 Strategy

References